The 2016 Delaware Fightin' Blue Hens football team represented the University of Delaware as a member of the Colonial Athletic Association (CAA) during the 2016 NCAA Division I FCS football season. The Fightin' Blue Hens were led by fourth-year head coach Dave Brock for the first six games of the season, before he was fired on October 16, following a loss to William & Mary. Co-defensive coordinator Dennis Dottin-Carter was named interim head coach for the remainder of the season. Delaware finished the season with an overall record of 4–7 and a mark of 2–6 in conference play, placing tenth in the CAA. The team played home games at Delaware Stadium in Newark, Delaware.

Schedule

Game summaries

Delaware State

 Most points in a regulation game since October 27, 2007 (59–52 win at Navy)
 Most points in a season-opening game since 1993 (62–21 win vs. Lehigh)
 Most rushing yards (395) since September 23, 2000 (84–0 win vs. West Chester; 443 yards)
 Most total yards (487) since October 26, 2013 (35–13 win at Rhode Island; 500 yards)
 Delaware's 300th win at Delaware Stadium (300–100–4 all time)

Lafayette

Wake Forest

James Madison

James Madison is coming off of a share of the CAA Championship in 2015, and qualified for the FCS Playoffs.

Maine

William & Mary

Stony Brook

Towson

Albany

Richmond

Villanova

References

Delaware
Delaware Fightin' Blue Hens football seasons
Delaware Fightin' Blue Hens football